Dubki may refer to:
Dubki, Republic of Dagestan, an urban-type settlement in the Republic of Dagestan, Russia
Dubki, Bezhanitsky District, Pskov Oblast, a village in Bezhanitsky District of Pskov Oblast, Russia
Dubki, Ostrovsky District, Pskov Oblast, a village in Ostrovsky District of Pskov Oblast, Russia
Dubki, Pechorsky District, Pskov Oblast, a village in Pechorsky District of Pskov Oblast, Russia; an exclave with no land connection with mainland Russia
Dubki, Pskovsky District, Pskov Oblast, a village in Pskovsky District of Pskov Oblast, Russia
Dubki, name of several other rural localities in Russia
 A type of drum from Eastern India and Bangladesh.

See also
Dubki (crater), a crater on Mars